Kanze Motoshiga (1398-1467), also On'ami, was a Japanese Noh actor who led the Kanze troupe from 1433 until his death. His relationship with Shogun Ashikaga Yoshinori (1394-1441) led to the rise of both Noh and the Kanze troupe as art forms favored by the shoguns. None of Motoshiga's plays or other writing survive.

Biography
Motoshiga had a controversial relationship with his uncle Zeami Motokiyo, the best-remembered of the Kanze playwrights. Although Zeami wanted his son Motomasa to succeed him as tayū, or head of the troupe, Motoshiga established a rival troupe that gained the favor of the shogun. The shogun preferred Motoshiga's low-brow style of performance and Motomasa fled to the provinces.

Motoshiga often played at Kōfuku Temple in Nara. The various Noh troupes were invited to three annual festivals at the temple. The temple was responsible for much of their income. Motoshiga organized theatrical festivals that went on for several days and charged admission. They were held at Tadasugawa in Kyoto in 1433 and 1464. The 1433 festival celebrated Motoshiga's ascension to tayū. In 1464, Matasaburō, Motoshiga's son was the same age his father had been at the previous festival. There was a circular stage surrounded by a viewing stand. This is the classic Noh stage, the earliest example for which diagrams survive. The shogun attended and the festival lasted for three days and featured 29 plays. Motoshiga starred in twelve of these despite the fact that he was nearly 70 at the time and had already retired as tayū.

Motoshiga was succeeded as tayū by his son Matasaburō. Motoshiga adopted the name On'ami when he became a Buddhist priest. The name reorders the syllables from "Kanzeon," the bodhisattva of compassion. The earliest usage example is from 1458. By the time he died, Noh was well on its way to becoming an art form identified with the samurai class. The Kanze troupe received the patronage of the warrior class. Kanze became the hereditary troupe of the shogun and the best actors of other troupes were required to join.

Notes

References

1398 births
1467 deaths
15th-century Japanese male actors